René Bauwens (11 March 1894 – 29 August 1959) was a Belgian freestyle swimmer and water polo player who competed in the 1920 and 1928 Summer Olympics.

In 1920 he won a silver medal with the Belgian water polo team, and was eliminated in the first round of the 4×200 metre freestyle relay event. Eight years later his water polo team finished fifth. He played both matches and scored two goals.

See also
 List of Olympic medalists in water polo (men)

References

External links

 

1894 births
1959 deaths
Belgian male water polo players
Belgian male freestyle swimmers
Olympic silver medalists for Belgium
Olympic swimmers of Belgium
Olympic water polo players of Belgium
Swimmers at the 1920 Summer Olympics
Water polo players at the 1920 Summer Olympics
Water polo players at the 1928 Summer Olympics
Olympic medalists in water polo
Medalists at the 1920 Summer Olympics
Place of birth missing
20th-century Belgian people